Elections for Langbaurgh Borough Council took place in May 1973. The entire Langbaurgh Borough Council was up for election as it was the first election since its formation. The Labour Party won the most seats but there was no overall control of the council.

Election result

References

1973 English local elections
1973
1970s in North Yorkshire